Lorn is a suburb of Maitland in New South Wales, Australia. It is located across the Hunter River from Maitland by the Belmore Bridge.

History
In 1823 Thomas McDougall received a land grant of 360 hectares on the banks of the Hunter River opposite the thriving village of West Maitland. This land was to become known as Lorn. Following the English and American model in 1911 planning was well underway to make Lorn a Garden Suburb with street plantations and reserved established from this time. With subdivisions of the land divided between the McDougall family by 1923 the completion of the main residential of today's Lorn was made and in 1927 it was stated, "the fine suburb of Lorn is regarded as a model residential area".

References

External links 
 Maitland Visitor Information Centre

Suburbs of Maitland, New South Wales